.NET Bio is an open source bioinformatics and genomics library created to enable simple loading, saving and analysis of biological data. It was designed for .NET Standard 2.0 and was part of the Microsoft Biology Initiative in the eScience division.

History 
.NET Bio was originally built and released by Microsoft Research under the name Microsoft Biology Foundation (MBF) and was later repackaged and released by the Outercurve Foundation as a fully public and open source project under the Apache License 2.0.

Capabilities 
The library consists of a set of object-oriented classes written in C# to perform common bioinformatic tasks such as:

 Read and write standard alignment and sequence-oriented data files such as FASTA and GenBank.
 Access online web services such as NCBI BLAST to search known databases for sequence fragments.
 Algorithms for local and global alignments.
 Algorithms for sequence assembly, including a parallel DeNovo assembler implementation.

Even though the library itself is written in C#, it may be used from any .NET compatible language and has samples of various usages including from IronPython scripting.

See also 

 Genome Compiler 
 Open Bioinformatics Foundation
 BioJava, BioPerl, BioPython, BioRuby
 Bioclipse

References

External links 
 .NET Bio Website
 Original MBF Website
 Microsoft Biology Initiative

.NET software
Software that uses Mono (software)
Bioinformatics software
Free and open-source software
Microsoft free software
Software using the Apache license